Todd Nelson (born March 18, 1961, in The Dalles, Oregon, is a former professional tennis player from the United States.

Nelson enjoyed most of his tennis success while playing doubles.  During his career he finished runner-up in four doubles events and one singles event. He achieved a career-high doubles ranking of world No. 48 in 1987.

ATP career finals

Singles: 1 (1 runner-up)

Doubles: 4 (4 runner-ups)

ATP Challenger and ITF Futures finals

Singles: 1 (0–1)

Doubles: 6 (3–3)

Performance timelines

Singles

Doubles

Mixed doubles

External links
 
 

African-American male tennis players
American male tennis players
Arizona State Sun Devils men's tennis players
Tennis players from San Diego
People from The Dalles, Oregon
Tennis people from Oregon
1961 births
Living people
21st-century African-American people
20th-century African-American sportspeople